Local elections were held in Muntinlupa on May 9, 2016, within the Philippine general election. The voters elected for the elective local posts in the city: the mayor, vice mayor, the congressman, and the 16 councilors, eight each in the two local legislative districts of Muntinlupa.

Background
Incumbent Jaime Fresnedi is running for a fifth nonconsecutive term as Mayor of Muntinlupa. He was a former city legal officer before elected vice mayor from 1988 until he was elected mayor in 1998. He ran for mayor in 2010; however, he was defeated by then incumbent Aldrin San Pedro. He ran again and won in the 2013 elections. His opponents are former mayor Aldrin San Pedro and incumbent vice mayor Artemio Simundac. San Pedro was a former Sangguniang Kabataan chairman and city councilor in 1995 and was elected vice mayor in 2004. In 2007, he ran and won as Mayor of Muntinlupa defeating Lor Fresnedi, wife of Mayor Jaime Fresnedi. In 2010, he defeated Fresnedi but lost for his third and final term in 2013. Simundac was a former barangay captain of Cupang and ABC president and was elected vice mayor in 2007.

Candidates

Congressman
Incumbent representative Rodolfo Biazon is not running. His son, former Customs commissioner and former Muntinlupa representative Ruffy Biazon, and former Optical Media Board chairman Ronnie Ricketts faced each other in the congressional election.

Mayor

Vice Mayor

Councilors

Team Fresnedi

Partido San Pedro

Bagong Muntinlupa

1st District

|-bgcolor=black
|colspan=8|

2nd District

|-bgcolor=black
|colspan=8|

References

2016 Philippine local elections
Elections in Muntinlupa
2016 elections in Metro Manila